Stephen Carpenter Earle (January 4, 1839 – December 12, 1913) was an architect who designed a number of buildings in Massachusetts and Connecticut that were built in the late 19th century, with many in Worcester, Massachusetts. He trained in the office of Calvert Vaux in New York City. He worked for a time in partnership with James E. Fuller, under the firm "Earle & Fuller".  In 1891, he formed a partnership with Vermont architect Clellan W. Fisher under the name "Earle & Fisher".

Earle's most noted work is the Richardsonian Romanesque Slater Memorial Museum on the campus of the Norwich Free Academy in Norwich, Connecticut, where he had a generous budget and a sympathetic patron. In 2015, the Hartford Courant called the Slater Museum the "crown jewel among Norwich's cultural treasures" and "a masterpiece of Romanesque revival design."

In December 1913, Earle died at Memorial Hospital in Worcester after becoming ill with pneumonia.

Selected works
He designed university buildings, commercial buildings, churches, and more.  Among his university clients were Clark University, Worcester Polytechnic Institute, and Grinnell College.

Worcester, Massachusetts
Armsby Block, 144-148 Main St.
Bancroft Tower, Bancroft Tower Rd. (Earle & Fisher)
 Boynton Hall, the first building at Worcester Polytechnic Institute (1868); Earle's son Ralph later became WPI's sixth president.
Central Congregational Church, corner of Grove St. and Institute Rd. (1886)
Hope Cemetery, 119 Webster St.
Jonas Clark Hall, Clark University campus (1887)
John Legg House, 5 Claremont St. 
One or more structures in Oxford-Crown Historic District, Roughly bounded by Chatham, Congress, Crown, Pleasant, Oxford Sts. and Oxford Pl.
Pilgrim Congregational Church, 909 Main St.
Providence Street Firehouse, 98 Providence St. (Earle & Fisher) 
Salisbury Factory Building 2, 49-51 Union St.
South Unitarian Church, 888 Main St. (Earle & Fisher)
St. Mark's Episcopal Church (Worcester, Massachusetts), Freeland St., a Romanesque building built in 1888, listed on the NRHP
St. Matthew's Episcopal Church (Worcester, Massachusetts), 693 Southbridge St. (Earle & Fisher)
D. Wheeler Swift House, 22 Oak Ave.
Union Congregational Church, 5 Chestnut St. (Earle,Stephen & C. Fisher)
 Walker-White House, a Queen Anne house at 47 Harvard Street in Worcester
One or more structures in Washburn Square-Leicester Common Historic District, Main St., Washburn Sq., 3 Paxton St. Leicester MA (Earle & Fisher)
Whitcomb Mansion, 51 Harvard St.
Worcester Art Museum original building, 55 Salisbury St.
Worcester County Courthouse, 2 Main Street, 1878 addition to original structure
Worcester Five Cents Savings Bank, 316 Main St., built in 1891

Other Massachusetts
 Christ Church Cathedral, Springfield, Massachusetts, built in 1876
Old Chapel, University of Massachusetts campus, Amherst, Massachusetts
Leicester Public Library, 1136 Main Street, Leicester, Massachusetts
Pilgrim Congregational Church, Columbia Rd, Dorchester, Massachusetts
Lyon Memorial Library (Monson Free Library), 2 High St., Monson, Massachusetts
One or more structures in Princeton Center Historic District, Jct. of Hubbardston and Mountain Rds., Princeton, Massachusetts
Old Chapel, at the University of Massachusetts Amherst, built in 1885
Rock Castle School, Prospect St., Webster, Massachusetts, (Earle & Fuller)
Memorial Hall, Canton, Massachusetts
Sacred Heart R. C. Church, Gardner, Massachusetts, 1887-93

Connecticut
Carroll Building, 9-15 Main St., and 14-20 Water St., Norwich, Connecticut, a building built in 1887, listed on the National Register of Historic Places
Slater Library and Fanning Annex, 26 Main St., Griswold, Connecticut
Slater Memorial Museum, said to be perhaps his finest work.
Park Congregational Church

Rhode Island
 Burnside Memorial Hall in Bristol, Rhode Island, is a two-story Richardsonian Romanesque public building on Hope Street. It was dedicated in 1883 by President Chester A. Arthur and Governor Augustus O. Bourn, to the memory of Ambrose Burnside, Civil War General and Rhode Island Governor.
 Rogers Free Library, Bristol, Rhode Island

Iowa
Goodnow Hall, the oldest building on the Grinnell College campus (Grinnell, Iowa), built after most of the campus was destroyed by tornado in 1882
 Mears Hall, Grinnell College campus, Grinnell, Iowa

Nova Scotia, Canada 

 Christ Church (Anglican), Windsor, Nova Scotia, constructed in 1882. Designed by Earle, it was built by a local contractor, Joseph Taylor. The building is a fine example of the carpenter gothic style architecture that influenced many church buildings from the mid-nineteenth century onwards in the Maritimes.

Gallery

References

Further reading
 Diaries of Ruth Earle Southwick 1921–1925, . Ruth was the fourth of Stephen C. Earle's five children and his only daughter.
 Stephen C. Earle, Architect: Shaping Worcester's Image, available through the Worcester Historical Museum

External links

 

1839 births
1913 deaths
People from Leicester, Massachusetts
Architects from Worcester, Massachusetts
Architects from Massachusetts
Richardsonian Romanesque architecture